Eduard Hafner (born January 19, 1955 in Jesenice, Yugoslavia) is a retired Slovenian professional ice hockey player.

Career

Club career
Hafner began his career with HK Kranjska Gora in the Yugoslav Ice Hockey League in 1969. In 1972, he joined HK Jesenice. Hafner also played with HC Alleghe in the Serie A. He retired in 1991, after a career spanning 23 seasons.

International career
Hafner represented the Yugoslavia national ice hockey team at eleven IIHF World Championships, and the Winter Olympics in 1976 and 1984. He played in 203 matches with the national team, scoring 108 goals, and adding 79 assists.

References

1955 births
Living people
HK Acroni Jesenice players
Ice hockey players at the 1976 Winter Olympics
Ice hockey players at the 1984 Winter Olympics
Olympic ice hockey players of Yugoslavia
Sportspeople from Jesenice, Jesenice
Slovenian ice hockey coaches
Slovenian ice hockey centres
Yugoslav ice hockey centres
HC Alleghe players
Yugoslav expatriate ice hockey people
Yugoslav expatriate sportspeople in Italy
Expatriate ice hockey players in Italy